Aris Thessaloniki Volleyball Club is the professional volleyball team of A.C. Aris Thessaloniki, the major multi-sport club of Thessaloniki, Greece. Aris VC participates in the A2 League and it is one of the most historical teams of the whole club and of the most stable values of the Greek volleyball, inside and outside its borders.

History

Aris was the first team to end Olympiacos and Panathinaikos domination of the sport, conquering the Greek Championship in 1997. Aris' roster, that period, was the strongest the club ever had, as it included top scorers Ganev, Konstantinov and some of the most capable Greek players then available: Alexandropoulos, Papakosmas, Melkas, Mitroudis, Chatziantoniou etc.

The club has to demonstrate a very decent and respectful presence in the Greek Cup as well, having reached the final six times. The fact that they had to play all the finals against the season's champions (Olympiacos 5 times and Iraklis 1 time), prevented Aris from winning even one of them. However, they won the Super Cup in 1997. The following season they participated in the Champions League, with a remarkable presence and especially an unforgettable 3-0 road win against European champion Modena.

Honours

Domestic
Greek Volleyball League:
 Winners (1): 1996–97
Runners-up  (2): 1993–94, 1995–96, 
Greek Super Cup: 
 Winners (1): 1996–97
Greek Cup: 
 Runners-up  (6): 1988–89, 1991–92, 1993–94, 1996–97, 1997–98, 2001–02

International		
 CEV Cup:
 Semi Finalists  (2): 1993–94, 1995–96

Current men's volleyball squad
Season 2018-2019

Technical and managerial staff

Notable players 

  Lyubomir Ganev
  Plamen Konstantinov
  Michalis Alexandropoulos
  Nikos Doukas
  Andrej Kravárik
  Giorgos Lykoudis
  Giannis Melkas
  Thanassis Moustakidis
  Dimitris Modiotis
  Vasilis Mitroudis
  Kostas Prousalis
  Nikos Roumeliotis
  Nikos Smaragdis
  Sokratis Tzoumakas
  Sotiris Sotiriou
  Riley Salmon
  Clayton Stanley
  Jakovljevic Milos

Notable coaches 

  Sotiris Ieroklis
  Giorgos Kosmatos
  Notis Litsas
  Kostas Charitonidis

Sponsorships
Official Sponsor: Joker, Euromedica
Official Broadcaster: Nova Sports

See also
Aris Thessaloniki Women's Volleyball
Aris Thessaloniki
Aris Thessaloniki F.C.
Aris BC

References

External links
ARIS AC Official website
Official A1 League website
Hellenic Federation of Volleyball official website
International Volleyball Federation official website
Press
All about Aris 

Aris Thessaloniki
Aris V.C.
Greek volleyball clubs

fi:Aris Thessaloniki